Hiawatha's Rabbit Hunt is a 1941 Merrie Melodies cartoon directed by Friz Freleng. Mel Blanc voiced all characters. This film was nominated for the Academy Award for Best Short Subject (cartoons). This was the first Bugs Bunny cartoon directed by Friz Freleng. The short makes several direct references to The Song of Hiawatha, an epic poem by Henry Wadsworth Longfellow.

Plot
Bugs is reading The Song of Hiawatha out loud to himself and the saga turns real as a pint-sized, Elmer Fudd-like Hiawatha (minus the speech impediment) turns up, paddling his canoe. Hiawatha is looking for a rabbit for his dinner. Hiawatha manages to trick Bugs into thinking he is preparing a hot bath for him. It is actually a cooking pot, which Bugs quickly vacates once Hiawatha casually mentions that he is having rabbit stew for supper.

Reception
The Film Daily called the short a "very funny cartoon", saying, "the result is a howl from start to finish. The serious-minded Indian's efforts to catch the screwball rabbit for stewing purposes makes a lively and comical race. Bugs Bunny gets better and funnier with every screen appearance."

Home media
 VHS - Bugs Bunny Cartoon Festival Featuring "Little Red Riding Rabbit" 
 DVD - Warner Bros. Home Entertainment Academy Awards Animation Collection
 DVD - The Maltese Falcon 3-Disc Special Edition
 Blu-ray - Looney Tunes Platinum Collection: Volume 3.
 LaserDisc - The Golden Age of Looney Tunes, Volume 2, Side 2

Notes
 This was one of the 12 Bugs Bunny cartoons that were pulled out of Cartoon Network's June Bugs 2001 marathon by order of AOL Time Warner due to having a negative caricature of a Native American.

References

External links
 
 
 Hiawatha's Rabbit Hunt on the Internet Archive

1941 films
1941 short films
1941 animated films
1940s animated short films
Short films directed by Friz Freleng
Merrie Melodies short films
1941 comedy films
Films about Native Americans
Films about hunters
Films scored by Carl Stalling
Bugs Bunny films
Films produced by Leon Schlesinger
Films with screenplays by Michael Maltese
1940s Warner Bros. animated short films
Cultural depictions of Hiawatha
Films based on works by Henry Wadsworth Longfellow
Works based on The Song of Hiawatha